Michael S. Greenly (born October 2, 1944) is an American writer, entrepreneur, and lyricist – and a former vice president of Avon Products—who helped to popularize interactive online journalism in the mid-1980s as a kind of forerunner to blogging. On March 26, 2015, Gov. Terry McAuliffe signed Senate Bill # 1362 making “Our Great Virginia” – lyrics by Mike Greenly, arranged by Jim Papoulis – as the official traditional state song of Virginia.

Early online journalist
In 1983, Greenly left his position as a marketing vice president of Avon Products to become a freelance marketing consultant and writer. In an article for The Futurist magazine (March–April, 1987), Greenly credited the Alvin Toffler book, The Third Wave, as being a catalyst in his decision to change his life and become an active part of the Information Age.

Greenly has been called "probably the most widely read writer on "The Source", one of the first online services oriented to the general public and attracting 60,000 subscribers at the time.

Sometimes called "planet earth's first interactive journalist" Greenly and the two friends he met online – Sherwin Levinson and Diane Worthington – became the first journalists ever allowed to cover the Democratic and Republican political conventions via computer (in 1984).  Greenly wrote a cover story for Portable 100/200 magazine (April, 1985) about using an early laptop computer to create this interactive, online journalism from the convention sites (Houston and San Francisco) and to answer reader questions and comments during the process.

Greenly went on to become the first journalist ever allowed to cover the Academy Awards ceremony by computer, again sending online reports of his interviews and experiences to readers around the world via laptop, and responding to them from on the road.

In 1986, a series of first-hand interviews Mike conducted about AIDS and placed online was published as Chronicle: The Human Side of AIDS (Irvington Publishers, Inc.). In 1987, Greenly received an award from the Computer Press Association in the category of "Best On-Line Publication" for his interactive electronic coverage of Appleworld, Macworld Conference & Expo, and Comdex '87.

Corporate assignments

As his website notes, Greenly works today as a speech and presentation writer and speech coach for business executives.  His client list includes Johnson & Johnson, Novartis, the Patrón Spirits Company, ExxonMobil, IBM and many other organizations.

Songwriter/lyricist

References

External links 
 Mike Greenly

1944 births
Living people
American male journalists
American lyricists
Duke University alumni
New York University Stern School of Business alumni
20th-century American non-fiction writers
21st-century American non-fiction writers
20th-century American male writers
21st-century American male writers